Ilala may refer to:

 Ilala, a village in Simret municipality, Ethiopia
 Ilala District in Dar es Salaam, Tanzania
 Ilala River near Mekelle, Ethiopia
 Ilala (Iringa Urban ward), an administrative ward in the Iringa Urban district of Tanzania
 Ilala ward, administrative ward in the Ilala district of Tanzania
 Ilala, Kwara, a town in Kwara state
 Ilala (Zambia), a geographical region of Zambia
 MV Ilala, a steamer  plying the waters of Lake Malawi